The Penang State Mosque or Masjid Negeri Pulau Pinang is a state mosque located at Jalan Masjid Negeri (Green Lane) in George Town, Penang, Malaysia.

History
Construction of the mosque began on 1977 with the foundation stone was officially laid by Yang di-Pertua Negeri (Governor) of Penang, Tun Sardon Jubir on 16 July 1977. The mosque was completed in 1980 and was officially opened on 29 August 1980 by the seventh Yang di-Pertuan Agong, Sultan Ahmad Shah of Pahang.

Features
The mosque was inspired by Brazilian Oscar Niemeyer's design of Cathedral of Brasilia in Brasilia, capital of Brazil. Its architecture is an amalgamation of Western Modernist. The mosque was designed by the Filipino architect, Efren Brindez Paz.

See also
 Islam in Malaysia

References

External links 

 Photo: http://www.photographersdirect.com/buyers/stockphoto.asp?imageid=1833942 

Mosques in Penang
Mosques completed in 1980
1980 establishments in Malaysia
Mosque buildings with domes